The Diamond Lake neighborhood is in the Nokomis community in Minneapolis. It is bounded by Diamond Lake Road and 55th Street on the north, Cedar Avenue on the east, 62nd Street on the south, and Interstate 35W on the west. It has approximately 2233 households within its boundaries. The Diamond Lake neighborhood, together with Hale and Page, forms the HPDL.

References

External links
Minneapolis Neighborhood Profile - Diamond Lake
The Diamond Lake Wiki
Hale-Page-Diamond Lake Community Association

Neighborhoods in Minneapolis